"June Afternoon" is a song by Swedish pop music duo Roxette, released in January 1996 as the second single from their second greatest hits compilation album, Don't Bore Us, Get to the Chorus! Roxette's Greatest Hits (1995). The single was only released in Europe, Australia, and Canada, peaking at number one in the Czech Republic and within the top 40 in numerous territories. Its accompanying music video was directed by Jonas Åkerlund.

Written by Per Gessle, the song was predominantly recorded by members of Gyllene Tider—Gessle's former band. The single was backed by the previously unreleased demo "Seduce Me", which was written by Marie Fredriksson and Gessle for the duo's 1991 album, Joyride. It was later included on the 2006 release of The Rox Box/Roxette 86-06.

Critical reception
Brendon Veevers from British webzine Renowned for Sound noted that "its lyrics are playful and its vibe is sweet bubblegum and sunshine."

Track listings
All songs are written by Per Gessle except "Seduce Me", music by Marie Fredriksson and Gessle; "Listen to Your Heart" music by Gessle and Mats MP Persson.

 European CD single 
 "June Afternoon" – 4:15
 "Seduce Me"  – 3:55

 European maxi-single 
 "June Afternoon" – 4:15
 "Seduce Me"  – 3:55
 "June Afternoon"  – 4:14

 UK CD single 
 "June Afternoon" – 4:15
 "Seduce Me"  – 3:55
 "It Must Have Been Love" – 4:19
 "Listen to Your Heart"  – 5:14

Credits and personnel
Credits are adapted from the liner notes of The Pop Hits.

Recording
 Recorded in August 1995 at EMI Studios and Studio Stacken (Stockholm, Sweden)Personnel'''

 Marie Fredriksson – lead and background vocals
 Per Gessle – lead and background vocals, acoustic and electric guitars, kazoo and mixing
 Micke "Syd" Andersson – drums and tambourine
 Anders Herrlin – bass guitar
 Mats Holmquist – string arrangements and conducting

 Michael Ilbert – engineering and mixing
 Björn Norén – strings and horns recording engineer
 Clarence Öfwerman – string and horn arrangements, production and mixing
 Mats "MP" Persson – acoustic and electric guitars
 Stockholms Nya Kammarorkester  – orchestration
 Sveriges Radios Symfoniorkester – woodwind quartet

Charts

Release history

References

1995 songs
1996 singles
EMI Records singles
English-language Swedish songs
Music videos directed by Jonas Åkerlund
Number-one singles in the Czech Republic
Roxette songs
Songs written by Per Gessle